Mehrdad Bazrpash (born  1980 in Tehran) is an Iranian principlist politician, and the current Minister of Roads and Urban Development since December 2022. He was also the President of the Supreme Audit Court from 2020 to 2022.

He was formerly member of Iran Parliament and  CEO of two largest Iran's automaker SAIPA and Pars Khodro in 2000s and served as Iran's Vice President and head of Iran's National Youth Organization. He publishes Vatan-e-Emrooz.

Electoral history

References

External links 

 

Living people
1980s births
Members of the 9th Islamic Consultative Assembly
Coalition of the Pleasant Scent of Servitude politicians
Front of Islamic Revolution Stability politicians
Vice presidents of Iran
Iranian newspaper publishers (people)
Sharif University of Technology alumni
Presidential advisers of Iran
Popular Front of Islamic Revolution Forces politicians
Iranian industrial engineers